The Army of Norway, also simply Army Norway, was a German army operating in the far north of Norway and Finland during World War II. The Army of Norway was under Armeeoberkommando Norwegen (Army High Command Norway), abbreviated AOK Norwegen, which was one of the two army echelon headquarters controlling German troops in the far north.

Armeeoberkommando Norwegen was directly subordinate to OKH, the high command headquarters of the Wehrmacht. It was created from Army Group XXI in December 1940, itself a successor of the XXI Army Corps, and disbanded in December 1944, with its assets taken over by the 20th Mountain Army.

Operations 

The Army of Norway took part in Operation Barbarossa in 1941.  In talks between Finnish and German staffs in Helsinki in June 1941, the Germans were given military responsibility over northern Finland; Army Norway was to take Murmansk and the Murmansk railway.  The plan was codenamed Operation Silberfuchs (Silver Fox).

The Army was evacuated from Norway in 1945 as part of the Operation Uberbirkhahn.

Commanders

Commander-in-Chief

Assets 
German Army of Norway (Falkenhorst)

 From January 1941:
 XXXIII Corps
 XXXVI Corps
 Gebirgskorps Norwegen
 From July 1941: (during Operation Silberfuchs)
 XXXIII Corps
 XXXVI Corps
 LXX Corps
 Gebirgskorps Norwegen
 From September 1941:
 XXXIII Corps
 XXXVI Corps
 LXX Corps
 Gebirgskorps Norwegen
 Finnish III Corps
 From March 1942: (after creation of German Twentieth Mountain Army)
 XXXIII Corps
 LXX Corps
 LXXI Corps

See also 
 20th Mountain Army

References 

A
N
Norway in World War II
Military units and formations established in 1940
Military units and formations disestablished in 1944